Kreiz Breizh Elites is a French stage cycling race held annually in Bretagne. It is part of the UCI Europe Tour and rated 2.2. Before 2007, the race was reserved for under-23 riders only.

Winners

References

External links
 

Cycle races in France
2000 establishments in France
Recurring sporting events established in 2000
UCI Europe Tour races